Leslie is a town in Gert Sibande District Municipality in the Mpumalanga province of South Africa. It is part of Leandra. The village is 63 km west of Bethal, Mpumalanga and 56 km east-south-east of Springs, Gauteng. Administered by a village council, it was laid out on the farm Brakkefontein and proclaimed in December 1939, an extension being proclaimed in December 1957. The village is thought to be named after Leslie in Fife, Scotland.

References

Populated places in the Govan Mbeki Local Municipality